Nasu may refer to:

 Nasu people, an ethnic group in China
 New American Standard Bible Update
 , a traditional name for a region in northern Tochigi Prefecture, Japan. It is also in the names of several places:
Nasushiobara, Tochigi, a city
Nasukarasuyama, Tochigi, a city
Nasu, Tochigi, a town 
Nasu District, Tochigi
Nasu Highlands, an open area 
Nasu Mountains, volcanic peaks in the region
Nasushiobara Station, a railway station takes its name from the region
, the Japanese word for eggplant
Nasu (manga), a 2000 manga series authored by Iou Kuroda
Nasu: Summer in Andalusia, a 2003 animated film adapted from Nasu
, Japanese footballer
Kinoko Nasu (born 1973), Japanese author, co-founder of TYPE-MOON
Sisu Nasu, military all-terrain transport vehicle of Finnish origin
Nasu (Zoroastrianism), a term meaning unclean and negative in Zoroastrianism
 Nasu language, a Loloish language spoken by Yi people of China
 National Academy of Sciences of Ukraine

Japanese-language surnames